Carpatolechia decorella is a moth of the family Gelechiidae. It is found in most of Europe, as well as in Turkey, the Caucasus, Kazakhstan, North Africa and on the Canary Islands.

The wingspan is 11–15 mm. Forewings are ochreous- whitish, often more or less mixed or wholly suffused with fuscous, sometimes ochreous-mixed ; a black mark along
costa at base ; stigmata large, black, very irregular, plical sometimes connected with costal mark, first discal much beyond plical. Hindwings somewhat over 1, light grey.

Adults emerge in July and overwinter. They can sometimes be found again in the following spring.

The larvae feed on Quercus and Cornus species. They feed inside a folded leaf their host plant.

References

Moths described in 1812
Carpatolechia
Moths of Europe
Moths of Asia
Moths of Africa